Prackovice nad Labem is a municipality and village in Litoměřice District in the Ústí nad Labem Region of the Czech Republic. It has about 600 inhabitants.

Administrative parts
The village of Litochovice nad Labem is an administrative part of Prackovice nad Labem.

References

Villages in Litoměřice District